Albert Rich Brand (October 22, 1889 – March 28, 1940) was an author and innovator in the recording of bird songs. Herbert J. Seligmann wrote Man and Bird Together: A Portrait of Albert R. Brand about him.

He was a stockbroker until age 39. At Cornell University he became a graduate student of ornithologist Arthur Augustus Allen. Brand collaborated with Cornell's engineering department to record bird songs, publishing two books accompanied by photographs. His first guide book about bird songs was accompanied by a phonograph record of a few dozen calls. He followed it up with a sequel with even more recordings.

He also recorded frogs. Sales of phonograph records of bird sounds were a key source of income for the Cornell Lab of Ornithology.

Bibliography
Songs of Wild Birds, T. Nelson and sons (1934)
More Songs of Wild Birds (1936)

See also
Macaulay Library, Cornell's library archive of animal sounds

References

Cornell University faculty
American ornithologists
Cornell University alumni
1889 births
1940 deaths
20th-century American zoologists